André Gattolin (born 24 June 1960) is a French ecologist politician and Senator for Hauts-de-Seine.

Biography
Born on 24 June 1960, he studied at Sciences-Po Paris and University of Paris III: Sorbonne Nouvelle. From 1996, he becomes marketing director of the French newspaper Libération. Since 2006, he has been teaching Communication Sciences at University of Paris III: Sorbonne Nouvelle.

Political career

Electoral mandates
 Senator of Hauts-de-Seine : Elected in 2011, re-elected in 2017.

Senatorial functions
 Vice-chair of the European Affairs Committee (since 2014)
 Member of the Culture Committee (since 2017)
 Vice-chair of the Finance Committee (2014-2017)

Political functions 
 Federal secretary of the Transnational Radical Party (1989)
 Délégué national adjoint of Europe Ecology – The Greens (2009-2011)

References

External links
 Official website
 André Gattolin on senat.fr

1960 births
Europe Ecology – The Greens politicians
French ecologists
Living people
People from Bourgoin-Jallieu
Sciences Po alumni
French Senators of the Fifth Republic
University of Paris alumni
Academic staff of the University of Paris
La République En Marche! politicians
Senators of Hauts-de-Seine
Politicians from Île-de-France